Qinhuangdao–Shenyang passenger railway or Qinshen railway is a passenger-dedicated high-speed railway between Qinhuangdao, Hebei province and Shenyang, Liaoning province of China, spanning a distance of . Construction started on August 16, 1999. Formally opened on October 12, 2003, it is the first newly built high-speed railway in China, costing CN¥15.7 billion (US$1.9 billion).

See also

Beijing–Shenyang high-speed railway
Beijing–Harbin Railway
Rail transport in China
List of railways in China

References

High-speed railway lines in China
Rail transport in Hebei
Rail transport in Liaoning
Railway lines opened in 2003
Standard gauge railways in China